

Total statistics

Statistics by country

Statistics by competition

Inter-Cities Fairs Cup

Balkans Cup

Cup Winners' Cup / UEFA Cup Winners' Cup

Intertoto Cup

European Cup / UEFA Champions League

UEFA Cup / UEFA Europa League

Notes

References

Botev Plovdiv
Botev